Lāčplēsis may refer to
Lāčplēsis, the national epic of Latvia
Lāčplēsis (rock opera)
A recipient of Order of Lāčplēsis
Lāčplēsis Day
Lāčplēsis (beer), the brand name of a Latvian beer brewery and its beer
Lāčplēsis, Lielvārde, a part of the town
Lāčplēsis (glider)